Alexander Schwolow (born 2 June 1992) is a German professional footballer who plays as a goalkeeper for Bundesliga club Schalke 04, on loan from Hertha BSC.

Club career

Youth years 
Schwolow began his youth career at 3. Liga side SV Wehen Wiesbaden. He left in 2008 for SC Freiburg's U17 team from where he later progressed to the U19 team.

SC Freiburg
In 2010, Schwolow was promoted to SC Freiburg's reserve team. He managed to start 51 games in the Regionalliga Südwest, conceding 77 goals while keeping 12 clean sheets.

On 1 January 2012, Schwolow was called up to SC Freiburg's first team. He made his first appearance on 10 May 2014 in a 3–2 loss to Hannover 96.

On 1 July 2015, SC Freiburg recalled Schwolow after one season on loan at Arminia Bielefeld, after selling Roman Bürki to Borussia Dortmund.

Arminia Bielefeld (loan)
On 1 July 2014, Schwolow agreed to a two-year loan to Arminia Bielefeld who aimed at gaining promotion following their relegation from the 2. Bundesliga. He made his debut on 26 July 2014 in 2–1 win over Mainz 05 II. Schwolow made his first appearance in a non-league game in a 4–1 win over SV Sandhausen in a DFB-Pokal match on 17 August 2014.

Hertha BSC 
On 4 August 2020, Hertha BSC agreed on a deal with SC Freiburg to sign Schwolow, after triggering his €8 million release clause. Under head coach Bruno Labbadia, the 28-year-old replaced long-time regular starter Rune Jarstein and made 18 Bundesliga appearances. As the Berlin-based side were in danger of relegation, Labbadia was replaced by Pál Dárdai, who had already coached the team from 2015 to 2019, and he preferred Jarstein in goal from matchday 19. However, Dárdai stated: "Alex Schwolow owns the future. He's number one, even if Rune is playing at the moment." On matchday 27, Schwolow returned in Hertha's goal as Jarstein was out after becoming infected with the Alpha variant of COVID-19 during the pandemic.

Schwolow became the starting goalkeeper again during the 2021–22 season, as Hertha were once again in a relegation fight. On 2 April 2022, he suffered a thigh injury in the league match against Bayer Leverkusen, ruling him out for the remainder of the season. He was replaced in goal by backup Marcel Lotka, and afterwards by Oliver Christensen in the relegation playoffs against Hamburger SV after Lotka broke his nose.

Schalke 04 (loan)
On  15 June 2022, Schalke 04 announced the signing of Schwolow on loan for the 2022–23 season.

International career
Schwolow has represented his country in youth levels but has not yet represented them at a senior level.

Career statistics

Honours
Arminia Bielefeld
 3. Liga: 2014–15

SC Freiburg
 2. Bundesliga: 2015–16

References

External links

 

Living people
1992 births
Sportspeople from Wiesbaden
German footballers
Footballers from Hesse
Association football goalkeepers
Germany youth international footballers
SV Wehen Wiesbaden players
SC Freiburg II players
SC Freiburg players
Arminia Bielefeld players
Hertha BSC players
FC Schalke 04 players
Bundesliga players
2. Bundesliga players
3. Liga players